John Jairo Toro Rendón (born April 4, 1958) is a retired Colombian football referee. He is known for having refereed one match in the 1998 FIFA World Cup in France, the Group C match between Denmark and South Africa, during which he handed out seven yellow cards and three reds.

In addition, he was a referee at the 1991 FIFA Women's World Cup.

References

1958 births
Colombian football referees
FIFA World Cup referees
Living people
Copa América referees
1998 FIFA World Cup referees
FIFA Women's World Cup referees